Walker Creek is a settlement on East Falkland, in the Falkland Islands, in Lafonia. It is on the shore of the Choiseul Sound, and overlooks Sea Lion Island in the distance. It is the second largest settlement on East Falkland south of Goose Green, after North Arm.

References

Populated places on East Falkland